Hypoaspis pratensis is a species of mite first found in Finland.

References

Laelapidae
Animals described in 2010